神 is a Chinese character meaning spirit or god.

神 may refer to:

Kami, the Japanese word for the spirits within objects in the Shinto faith
Shen, "spirit" or "god" in Chinese philosophy, Chinese religion, and Traditional Chinese Medicine